Magara Star Football Club is a football (soccer) club from Magara town of Bugarama Commune in the province of Rumonge, Burundi. The team currently plays in Burundi Premier League. The team was founded on March 31, 2014 by John-Clinton Nsengiyumva through his philanthropic foundation, Nsengiyumva Global Development.

History
On January 6, 2016, John-Clinton Nsengiyumva, the Chairperson of the Magara Star FC, acquired Nyanza-Lac United FC from Nyanza-Lac City in Makamka Province of Burundi and moved the acquired team to Magara town in Rumonge Province.

On January 9, 2016, John-Clinton Nsengiyumva merged Nyanza-Lac United FC into Magara Star FC and the local play-ground for former Nyanza-Lac United became The Stadium of Magara.

On January 16, 2016, in at Magara Stadium, Magara Star FC played its first match at the First Division level in Burundi. And this was also the first time, a team from Magara ever played at that level of soccer games and it was the first time a match of the first division in Burundi was ever played at Magara. The score was Magara Star FC 4 – 0 Olympic de Muremera FC.

Performance in Competitions
 2014 Bujumbura 3rd Division League: Position #1.
 2015–2016 National First Division League: Position #12.

Honours
 Champion of 2014 Bujumbura Provincial Football Association Cup for Third Division.

Personnel

Current technical staff

Last updated: 20 May 2016
Source: Magara Star FC

Management

References

External links
 Web Site
 Twitter
 Magara Star FC at FIFA.com

Football clubs in Burundi